Not for Publication is a 1984 screwball comedy film directed by Paul Bartel and starring Nancy Allen, David Naughton, Laurence Luckinbill, Alan Rosenberg, and Alice Ghostley. The film premiered on November 1, 1984 and was also screened at the 1985 Sundance Film Festival, where it was acquired for distribution by Thorn EMI Screen Entertainment.

Plot 
Lois Thornedyke is an ambitious journalist who works for The Informer, a tabloid newspaper in New York City. Though her editor Troppogrosso wants her to focus on "sex, scandal, and sin", Lois longs for the days when the newspaper was called The Enforcer, which was then run by her father and had a more respected image. At The Informer, Lois writer under the pen name "Louise Thorne". She also moonlights as a volunteer for the re-election campaign of Mayor Claude Franklyn. Franklyn, attracted to Lois and unaware of her affiliation with The Informer, recruits her as his personal assistant. Lois hires Barry Denver as a photographer for Franklyn's campaign, though Barry's previous experience was in ornithological photography. 

Troppogrosso assigns Lois to investigate a sex club called The Bestiary after he gets a tip that the mayor will be in attendance. Barry and Lois are able to sneak into the club dressed in animal costumes. Though they do not see the mayor, the party is interrupted when a gang of burglars storms the club. Posing as thieves themselves in order to get a scoop, Lois and Barry end up in the thieves' hideaway, where Barry discovers to his dismay that Lois is actually "Louise Thorne" of The Informer, and that he has inadvertently been working for the tabloid the whole time. 

It is revealed that Franklyn is actually the boss of the crime syndicate that was involved in the club robbery, and he had hired Troppogrosso to orchestrate the robberies as well as to run the tabloid, which is fifty percent owned by Franklyn. Franklyn admits this to Lois and Barry while they are on a plane en route to a campaign event. Unbeknownst to the mayor, Lois has surreptitiously recorded his confession. In exchange for not releasing the incriminating evidence to the public, Lois makes a deal with the mayor to have the name of The Informer changed back to The Enforcer. Later, the front page of the revamped newspaper announces that the mayor has won re-election and Lois and Barry are engaged.

Cast

Production
Paul Bartel and co-writer John Meyer's script was influenced by 1930s and 1940s screwball comedies. Bartel based the character name "Lois Thorndyke" on heroines from Frank Capra films and the comic book character Lois Lane.

Bartel's success from his previous film, Eating Raoul, enabled him to raise $3 million for this film, ten times the budget of Raoul. $2.5 million of the film's budget came from EMI. Bartel said the increased budget allowed for him to use a camera crane, hire relatively well known actors like Nancy Allen and David Naughton, and to produce a musical number in the film.

Filming began in New York City on October 3, 1983. After a week of filming in New York, the production relocated to Texas where Dallas stood in for New York. Filming concluded on November 22.

Reception

Box office
The film was not a financial success, and Bartel later suggested the lack of bigger name actors was part of the reason for its low box office.

Critical response
TV Guide wrote, "The story is wildly improbable and sometimes hilariously funny. The dialog is inventive and the characters bizarre, and it all smacks of those cult movies that will have a long life in the Saturday night midnight shows around the country." Vincent Canby of The New York Times said, "Like all of Mr. Bartel's films, Not for Publication has a number of comic conceits that more often prompt knowing smiles than knee-slapping laughter", adding, "You have to work to find it funny, though the rewards are there, especially in the [film's] intensely sincere performances." Canby opined that while the film has "too much plot", it would make for a great "midnight [screening] on a Saturday, after an evening of good food, good drink and whatever else it takes to lower one's resistance to something so cheerfully if intentionally slapdash."

Home media 
On June 30, 2020, Not for Publication was released as a restored 4K Blu-ray disc by Kino Lorber. The release includes audio commentary by Allan Arkush, Bartel's fellow filmmaker and friend, and filmmaker and historian Daniel Kremer.

References

External links
 
 
 

1984 films
1980s sex comedy films
American black comedy films
American satirical films
American screwball comedy films
American sex comedy films
1980s English-language films
Films directed by Paul Bartel
Films about journalists
Films set in New York City
Films shot in New York City
Films shot in Dallas
American independent films
The Samuel Goldwyn Company films
EMI Films films
1984 comedy films
1984 independent films
1980s American films